Hope is a township municipality in the Canadian province of Quebec, located within the Bonaventure Regional County Municipality. Its population was 568 in the Canada 2016 Census.

The only population centre within the township is Saint-Jogues.

History
The township was surveyed circa 1786, and named in honour of British Colonel Henry Hope (c. 1746 – 1789), lieutenant-governor of Quebec from 1785 to 1789. At that time, the township also included the territory of Hope Town, Paspébiac, and Saint-Godefroi.

In 1913, Saint-Godefroi split off, and in 1936, Hope Town became a separate incorporated municipality.

The community of Saint-Jogues was formed in 1930 when 52 settlers were encouraged to colonize Gaspésie's interior during the Great Depression. By 1937, there were 300 residents in this village.

Demographics 

Mother tongue:
 English as first language: 17.3%
 French as first language: 80.9%
 English and French as first language: 0%
 Other as first language: 1.7%

See also
List of township municipalities in Quebec

References

Township municipalities in Quebec
Incorporated places in Gaspésie–Îles-de-la-Madeleine